La pica sul Pacifico  is a 1959 Italian comedy film written and directed by Roberto Bianchi Montero and starring Tina Pica, Memmo Carotenuto, Elke Sommer and Matteo Spinola.

Cast
 Tina Pica - Adelaide Harold
 Memmo Carotenuto - Jack Carlone
 Elke Sommer - Rossana
 Matteo Spinola - Lorenzo
 Silvio Bagolini - Adone
 Ugo Tognazzi - Roberto De Nobel

References

External links

La Pica sul Pacifico at Variety Distribution

1959 films
1959 comedy films
1950s Italian-language films
Films directed by Roberto Bianchi Montero
Italian comedy films
Films with screenplays by Roberto Bianchi Montero
1950s Italian films